Bully is a commune in the Seine-Maritime department in the Normandy region in northern France.

Geography

Population

Places of interest
 The church of St. Eloi, dating from the thirteenth century.
 The sixteenth century manorhouse du Flot.

See also
Communes of the Seine-Maritime department

References

External links

Bully on the Quid website 

Communes of Seine-Maritime